Black Dub is the debut album by the Daniel Lanois-instigated collaboration Black Dub, an amalgam of dub, blues, soul and rock. Allmusic gave it three and a half stars out of five, praising singer Trixie Whitley's "deeply soulful contralto." All songs are written by Lanois, save for two, the group effort "Last Time." and the song "Ring the Alarm" written by Tenor Saw.

Black Dub consists of Daryl Johnson (bass), Trixie Whitley (vocals), Brian Blade (drums), and Daniel Lanois (piano, guitar).

Track listing

Personnel 
Musicians
 Trixie Whitley – vocals
 Daniel Lanois – guitar, keyboards, vocals
 Daryl Johnson – bass, vocals
 Brian Blade – drums, vocals
with:
 Christopher Thomas – bass on "Surely"
 Aaron Embry – keyboards on "Surely"
 Brady Blade Sr. – vocals on "Last Time"
 Mark Howard – drum programming on "Lovers Unloved"

Production
 Daniel Lanois – producer, engineer (mixing)
 Margaret Marissen – production assistant
 Keisha Kalfin – production assistant in LA
 Michael Tedesco – A&R Executive
 Mark Howard – engineer (recording, mixing)
 Tony Mangurian – engineer (additional engineering, editing)
 Gary Burden & Jenice Heo – art direction
 Pieter-Jan de Smet – cover image provider
 Adam CK Vollick – cinematography, photography
 John Huffman – photography

References

External links 
 Official Black Dub site

2010 debut albums
Daniel Lanois albums
albums produced by Daniel Lanois